Asal may refer to:

 Association for the Study of Australian Literature
 Algerian Space Agency
 Asal (film), a 2010 Tamil film starring Ajith Kumar
 "Aasal" (soundtrack), the soundtrack album from that film
 Asal, Yemen, a village in western central Yemen
 Asal, King of the Golden Pillars, a figure in Irish Celtic mythology
 Asal (grape), a Portuguese wine grape
 Mostafa Asal (born 2001), Egyptian squash player
Asal (given name), the given name
 Asal, the Somali word for origin